Judy Aron is a New Hampshire politician.

Education
Aron earned a B.A. in economics from State University of New York at New Paltz.

Career
On November 6, 2018, Aron was elected to the New Hampshire House of Representatives where she represents the Sullivan 7 district. Aron assumed office on December 5, 2018. Aron is a Republican.

Personal life
Aron resides in South Acworth, New Hampshire. Aron is married and has three children.

References

Living people
Women state legislators in New Hampshire
State University of New York at New Paltz alumni
People from Acworth, New Hampshire
Republican Party members of the New Hampshire House of Representatives
21st-century American women politicians
21st-century American politicians
Year of birth missing (living people)